The Gold Mohur Hotel is a resort hotel on Aden, Yemen.

On 29 December 1992, Al Qaeda conducted its first known terrorist attack in Aden, bombing the Gold Mohur Hotel, where U.S. servicemen were known to have been staying en route to Somalia for Operation Restore Hope. A Yemeni and an Austrian tourist died in the attack.

References

External links

Aden
Hotels in Yemen